Thaspium barbinode, known by the common names of bearded meadow-parsnip and hairy-jointed meadow-parsnip, is a member of the carrot family, Apiaceae. It is a perennial herb, native to the eastern United States, from eastern Texas to southeastern Wisconsin and the Florida panhandle to southern New York. Compared to Thaspium chapmanii, the herb is shorter, and has similar bright yellow flowers.

References

External links

Apioideae
Flora of the Eastern United States
Plants described in 1803
Plants described in 1818